Marianne Schönauer (1920–1997) was an Austrian stage, television and film actress. During her career she made over fifty appearances in film and television series and also enjoyed success as a singer.

She was born in Vienna as Marianne Schifferes to a Jewish father, Karl Schifferes. He fled  to France following the Anchluss, but was arrested and died in Auschwitz concentration camp in 1942.

Schönauer emerged as a star of Austrian cinema in the years following the Second World War in films such as G.W. Pabst's The Trial (1948). She married the art director Gustav Manker whom she divorced in 1956. She had 2 twin daughters, Marianne and Felicitas Schönauer born in Vienna 1958.

Selected filmography
 The Immortal Face (1947)
 On Resonant Shores (1948)
 The Trial (1948)
 Eroica (1949)
 Wedding with Erika (1950)
 Maria Theresa (1951)
 1. April 2000 (1952)
 Monks, Girls and Hungarian Soldiers (1952)
 The Poacher (1953)
 The Last Reserves (1953)
 A Night in Venice (1953)
 Bel Ami (1955)
 Don Juan (1955)
 My Daughter Patricia (1959)
 Dance with Me Into the Morning (1962)
 The Black Cobra (1963)
 I Learned It from Father (1964)

References

Bibliography 
 Fritsche, Maria. Homemade Men in Postwar Austrian Cinema: Nationhood, Genre and Masculinity. Berghahn Books, 2013. 
 Rentschler, Eric. The Films of G.W. Pabst: An Extraterritorial Cinema. Rutgers University Press, 1990.

External links 
 

1920 births
1997 deaths
Austrian television actresses
Austrian stage actresses
Austrian film actresses
20th-century Austrian women singers
Austrian Jews
Musicians from Vienna
Actresses from Vienna
20th-century Austrian actresses